A foreign settlement (pronounced "Gaikokujin kyoryūchi") was a special area in a treaty port, designated by the Japanese government in the second half of the nineteenth century, to allow foreigners to live and work.

After the visits of Commodore Perry in 1853 and 1854, Japan entered a period of rapid social and economic transition from a closed, feudalistic society to a more open, modern trading nation state. Japan first opened two ports to allow foreign trade, Shimoda and Hakodate after the signing the Convention of Kanagawa with the United States in 1854.  It then designated five more treaty ports in 1858 with the signing of the Treaty of Amity and Commerce., Yokohama, Kobe, Nagasaki, Osaka, and Niigata.

Trade agreements signed with the United States were swiftly followed by similar ones with Britain, the Netherlands, Russia and France. The ports permitted legal extraterritoriality for citizens of the treaty nations.

Before the system of treaty port concessions ended in 1899 seven foreign settlements had been established in Japan. They were, from north to south:

 Hakodate foreign settlement in Hakodate, Hokkaido
 Niigata foreign settlement in Niigata, Niigata
 Tsukiji foreign settlement in Tsukiji, Chūō-ku, Tokyo
 Yokohama foreign settlement in the Kannai and Yamate districts of Naka-ku, Yokohama, Kanagawa
 Kawaguchi foreign settlement in Kawaguchi, Nishi-ku, Osaka
 Kobe foreign settlement in Kobe, Hyogo
 Nagasaki foreign settlement in Oura, Nagasaki, Nagasaki

See also
 Treaty ports
 Dejima, Nagasaki, for the Dutch and Chinese traders, was the predecessor to the Nagasaki foreign settlement

References

External links
 Yokohama foreign settlement
 Yokohama Boomtown Foreigners in Treaty-Port Japan (1859–1872) - MIT

19th century in Japan
Bakumatsu
Meiji Restoration
1850s establishments in Japan
1899 disestablishments in Japan